Little v. Hall, 59 U.S. (18 How.) 165 (1856), was a United States Supreme Court case in which the Court held a contract with state officials to be the official publisher of court opinion documents does not transfer any copyright to that publisher, and they may not seek an injunction against someone else printing those documents.

References

External links
 
 

1856 in United States case law
United States copyright case law
United States Supreme Court cases
United States Supreme Court cases of the Taney Court